HD 178233 is a single star in the northern constellation of Lyra. It is bright enough to be dimly visible to the naked eye with an apparent visual magnitude of 5.53, making it a sixth magnitude star. The distance to HD 178233 is 134 light years based on parallax measurements, but it is drifting closer to the Sun with a radial velocity of approximately −24 km/s.

The stellar classification of this star was determined to be F0III by A. Cowley and associates (1969), matching an evolved F-type giant star. In contrast, D. R. Palmer and associates (1968) listed it as an A-type main-sequence star with a class of A7V. It is about a half billion years old and is spinning rapidly with a projected rotational velocity of 165.0 km/s, which is giving the star an equatorial bulge that is ~24% wider than the polar radius. The star has 1.5 times the mass and 1.8 times the mean radius of the Sun. It is radiating over eight times the luminosity of the Sun from its photosphere at an effective temperature of 7,220 K.

References

F-type giants
A-type main-sequence stars
Lyra (constellation)
Durchmusterung objects
093843
178233
7253